Harris–Currin House is a historic home and national historic district located at Wilton, Granville County, North Carolina.  It was built about 1883, and is a two-story, "L"-plan Queen Anne style frame dwelling.  It features a wraparound porch decorated with sawn woodwork and one-story rear kitchen and dining room ell.

It was listed on the National Register of Historic Places in 1988.

References

Farms on the National Register of Historic Places in North Carolina
Historic districts on the National Register of Historic Places in North Carolina
Queen Anne architecture in North Carolina
Houses completed in 1883
Houses in Granville County, North Carolina
National Register of Historic Places in Granville County, North Carolina